Ace Marine (foaled 1952 in Ontario) was a Canadian Thoroughbred Champion racehorse who in 1955 won the three races that four years later were officially designated the Canadian Triple Crown.

Background
Ace Marine was sired by Ace Admiral, a grandson of the six-time British Champion Sire Hyperion, out of the American mare Mazarine.

Purchased as a yearling by prominent owner/breeder Larkin Maloney, Ace Marine was trained by Canadian Hall of Fame trainer Yonnie Starr.

Racing career
At age two, the colt won two races and was a strong third to the then world-record-holding sprinter Boston Doge in the Newport Stakes at Narragansett Park in Pawtucket, Rhode Island.

In 1955, the three-year-old Ace Marine dominated his class in Canadian racing. He won two divisions of the Plate Trial Stakes, then the Queen's Plate, Canada's most prestigious race that for the first time was broadcast on television by the Canadian Broadcasting Corporation. He followed up with wins in other major Canadian races, notably the Prince of Wales Stakes and the Breeders' Stakes. His season saw him set a new Woodbine track record for 1⅛ miles. Ace Marine's performances earned him Canadian Horse of the Year honors.

Returning to race as a four-year-old in 1956, Ace Marine won the inaugural edition of the Canadian Maturity and the important Dominion Day Handicap.

Stud record
Ace Marine was retired to stud having won fourteen races, but as a sire met with only modest success.

Honors
In 2003, Ace Marine was inducted in the Canadian Horse Racing Hall of Fame.

References
 Ace Marine at the Canadian Horse Racing Hall of Fame

1952 racehorse births
Racehorses bred in Ontario
Racehorses trained in Canada
Horse racing track record setters
King's Plate winners
Canadian Thoroughbred Horse of the Year
Canadian Horse Racing Hall of Fame inductees
Triple Crown of Thoroughbred Racing winners
Thoroughbred family 3-h